Isaac Frederick Marcosson (September 13, 1876 - March 14, 1961) was an American magazine editor.

Biography
Marcosson was born in Louisville, Kentucky on September 13, 1876. He was educated in the schools of Louisville.

In 1903, he became associate editor of The World's Work, and in 1907, he became a member and financial editor of The Saturday Evening Post. From 1910 to 1913, he was editor of Munsey's Magazine.

He died on March 14, 1961, at the Doctors Hospital in Manhattan, New York City.

Works 
 The War After the War, (1916)  
 The Rebirth of Russia, (1917)  
 The Business of War, (1917)  
 Adventures in Interviewing, (1919)  
 An African Adventure, (1921)  
 Turbulent Years, (1938)  
 Charles Frohman, Manager and Man, with Daniel Frohman, (1917)
 Metal Magic: The Story of the American Smelting and Refining Company, (1949)
 The Black Golconda: The Romance of Petroleum, (1924)
 Caravans of Commerce, (1926)
 Leonard Wood: The Prophet of Preparedness, (1917)
 Peace and Business, (1919)
 S.O.S - America's Miracle in France, (1919)
 David Graham Phillips and His Times, (1932)
 The Autobiography of a Clown, (1910) (Jules Turnour)
 Wherever Men Trade: The Romance of the Cash Register, (1945) (the story of the National Cash Register Company (NCR))
 Colonel Deeds - Industrial Builder, (1947) (Edward Andrew Deeds)
 Anaconda (New York: Dodd, Mead 1957)

References

External links
 
 
 

American magazine editors
Writers from Louisville, Kentucky
1876 births
1961 deaths